The Lavender Languages and Linguistics Conference is an international conference for LGBT linguistics and other related queer language research and discourse studies. It provides a place for emerging queer linguistics scholarship. The conference is the longest continually running LGBT studies conference in the US.

In 2017 the conference expanded to a Summer Institute with 10 days of class discussion, research opportunities and informal conversations exploring topics of current interest in language and sexuality studies, queer linguistics, and various lavender language themes.

History 

The Lavender Languages and Linguistics Conference was founded in 1993 by William Leap to coincide with the March on Washington for Lesbian, Gay and Bi Equal Rights and Liberation. At the time, research on these topics was considered marginal within linguistics, and the conference was a key place for researchers to come together to discuss issues in the field. By the 20th conference, there were over 80 presentations and 150 attendees. The conference was host yearly at American University in Washington, DC until 2017 when the conference began to move each year.

A meta-synthesis of conference abstracts by Paul Baker and published in Milani's chapter in The Oxford Handbook of Language and Society found early work presented at the conference focused on the existence of "gay language" such as Polari and "lesbian language". In line with the trajectory of the field, more recent work has focused on how various linguistic features index different identities.

The Journal of Language and Sexuality (though not officially linked to LavLang) is closely affiliated with the conference. It was an established venue to publish queer linguistics research.

Conferences

Lavender Languages Summer Institute 
The Lavender Language Institute, a summer program that Leap founded at Florida Atlantic University in 2017, offers training in queer linguistics to undergraduates, grad students, and others interested in language and sexuality studies.

External links 

 https://www.facebook.com/lavlang
 https://twitter.com/lavlang?lang=en
 https://twitter.com/LavenderLangFAU
 https://www.fau.edu/artsandletters/lavender-languages/

References 

Linguistics conferences
LGBT conferences
International conferences
Recurring events established in 1993
LGBT studies